This is a list of bridges in Fujian, China.

Bridges

Anping Bridge
Gushan Bridge
Haicang Bridge
Huai'an Bridge (Fuzhou)
Langqi Minjiang Bridge
Qingzhou Bridge
Sanxianzhou Bridge
Slab bridge
Tianchi Bridge
Wuyuan Bridge
Xiabaishi Bridge
Xiamen Zhangzhou Bridge
Xingduicha Bridge
Wan'an Bridge

See also
List of bridges in China

Bridges in Fujian
Fujian